Rothie Rovers are a Scottish football club from the village of Rothienorman in Aberdeenshire. They are members of the North Region of the Scottish Junior Football Association and currently play in the North Region Second Division.

History

Rothie were formed in 1983 as an amateur club, playing in the Aberdeenshire Amateur Football Association. They joined the Scottish Junior Football Association in 2020, although their first season was interrupted by the coronavirus pandemic. Their home ground is the public park on Forgue Road in the village.

References

Football clubs in Scotland
Scottish Junior Football Association clubs
Association football clubs established in 1983
Football in Aberdeenshire
1983 establishments in Scotland
Sport in Aberdeenshire